Lanny Cordola (born 1961) is an American guitarist, songwriter and producer. He has been a member of bands such as Giuffria, House of Lords and Magdallan (also known as Magdalen after Ken Tamplin's departure).

Before joining Giuffria, Cordola was the main songwriter for his original bands named Lights, American Heroes and Mondo Cane with songs such as: "All For One", "Lonely Money", "Blow It All Away", "Nasty Girl", "Gypsy in a Twisted World", "Dream Carnival", "High on a Dream", "Empty Cabaret", "Can't Wait Any Longer", "Uncontrolled Fire", "Prime Time", "(She's So) Photogenic", "Walking on the Edge", "Violent City" and "Riddles in the Night".

Both American Heroes and Mondo Cane gained their greatest success in Hollywood in the early 1980s. Other contributing members of those bands included Bret Alstadt on lead vocals, Joey Leon on drums and Loren Robinson on bass guitar. Shawn Perry became Mondo Cane's manager in 1982 and Mark Lundquist, a keyboardist and backing vocalist, was added to the band in 1984. After Robinson left, the band went through three other bass players before disbanding in 1985.

Cordola attended Cypress High School in Cypress, California. He began his career by playing weekend parties in neighborhood garages, and then branched out into the entertainment circuit by playing in nightclubs. While "on tour" in the Southern California area, Paul Shook (guitar technician), Brent Cobleigh (bass guitar technician) and Scotty Gustafski (drum technician) were the road crew for American Heroes and Mondo Cane. They went on to start to form their own band, Charade, rehearsing several of AH/MC's songs.

Cordola has made several solo albums, as well as being featured as guest musician, songwriter and/or producer on albums with artists like Ken Tamplin and Ransom. Besides the guitar, he also masters other instruments. In 2006, Cordola was a contributor of the Bulgarian rock group D_2 and especially their third album, 6.

Cordola has also appeared on the popular American television sitcom Full House, as a member of Jesse Katsopolis's band, Jesse and the Rippers.

In 2014, following the reporting of a 2012 terrorist attack there, Cordola visited Kabul, Afghanistan. He later returned and engaged in youth work, teaching guitar to teenagers of the war-torn country. "The plan is to make this an entity where they can travel the world, play music, tell the story about their lives and the people of Afghanistan," Cordola is quoted as saying.

Discography 
Solo
 Electric Warrior, Acoustic Saint (1991)
 Of Riffs and Symphonies (1992)
 Salvation Medicine Show (1998)
An Afghan Lullaby (2015)

With Giuffria
 Silk + Steel (1986)

With House of Lords
 House of Lords (1988)
 The Power and the Myth (2004)
 Live in the UK (2007)

With Magdallan
 Big Bang (1992)
 End of the Age (1999)

With Magdalen
 Revolution Mind (1993)
 The Dirt (1994)

With Ken Tamplin
 In the Witness Box (1995)

With Tamplin and Friends
 An Axe to Grind (1990)

With DORO
 DORO (1990)

With Uthanda
 Believe (1992)

With Jazz Trio
 The Trinity Sessions (1995)

With Chaos is the Poetry
 Chaos is the Poetry (1996)

With Gary Griffin
 Blues for the Child (1993)

With Shades of Blue
 Shades of Blue (2010)

References 

American rock guitarists
American male guitarists
Living people
Place of birth missing (living people)
Giuffria members
House of Lords (band) members
1961 births
20th-century American guitarists
Shout (band) members
Magdallan members
20th-century American male musicians